Nasser Al-Omran (born 13 July 1997) is a Saudi Arabian footballer who plays as a midfielder for Saudi Pro League side Abha.

Career
Al-Omran started his career at Al-Shabab and is a product of the Al-Shabab's youth system. On 1 March 2018, Al-Omran made his professional debut for Al-Shabab against Al-Ittihad in the Pro League, replacing Turki Al-Ammar.  On 2 July 2019, Al-Omran signed a 4-year professional contract with Al-Shabab. On 28 January 2023, Al-Omran joined Abha on a two-and-a-half year deal.

Career statistics

Club

References

External links
 

1997 births
Living people
Saudi Arabian footballers
Sportspeople from Riyadh
Association football midfielders
Saudi Professional League players
Al-Shabab FC (Riyadh) players
Abha Club players
Saudi Arabia youth international footballers
Olympic footballers of Saudi Arabia
Footballers at the 2020 Summer Olympics